Poręba-Kocęby  is a village in the administrative district of Gmina Brańszczyk, within Wyszków County, Masovian Voivodeship, in east-central Poland.

The village has a population of 440.

External links
 Jewish Community in Poręba-Kocęby on Virtual Shtetl

References

Villages in Wyszków County